The 2015 Nana Trophy was a professional tennis tournament played on outdoor clay courts. It was the fourth edition of the tournament and part of the 2015 ITF Women's Circuit, offering a total of $50,000 in prize money. It took place in Tunis, Tunisia, on 4–10 May 2015.

Singles main draw entrants

Seeds 

 1 Rankings as of 27 April 2015

Other entrants 
The following players received wildcards into the singles main draw:
  Petia Arshinkova
  Cyrine Ben Cheikh
  Başak Eraydın
  Valeria Savinykh

The following players received entry from the qualifying draw:
  Jan Abaza
  Manon Arcangioli
  Conny Perrin
  Alice Savoretti

Champions

Singles

 María Irigoyen def.  Cindy Burger, 6–2, 7–5

Doubles

 María Irigoyen /  Paula Kania def.  Julie Coin /  Stéphanie Foretz, 6–1, 6–3

External links 
 2015 Nana Trophy at ITFtennis.com
 Official website 

2015 ITF Women's Circuit
2015
2015
2015 in Tunisian sport